PT-492 was a  of the United States Navy that served during World War II.

History
PT-492 was authorized by the United States Navy and laid down on 14 August 1943 at the Elco Works of the Electric Launch Company (now Electric Boat Company) at their Bayonne, New Jersey shipyard; launched on 4 November 1943; and completed on 3 December 1943. She was commissioned and attached to Motor Torpedo Boat Squadron 33 (MTBRon 33) under the command of Lt. A. Murray Preston and assigned to patrol in the Southwest Pacific.

She survived the war. In May 1946, she was transferred to the Foreign Liquidation Commission of the United States State Department and sold. Her fate is unknown.

References

1943 ships
World War II ships of the United States
492
World War II patrol vessels of the United States
Ships built in Bayonne, New Jersey